Dioryctria symphoniella is a species of snout moth in the genus Dioryctria. It was described by George Hampson in 1899 and is known from Assam, India.

References

Moths described in 1899
symphoniella